The 1911 Nebraska Cornhuskers football team represented the University of Nebraska as a member of Missouri Valley Conference (MVC) during the 1911 college football season. The team was coached by first-year head coach Ewald O. Stiehm and played its home games at Nebraska Field in Lincoln, Nebraska.

Following the retirement of W.C. Cole in 1910, Nebraska hired Stiehm as his replacement. Nicknamed "Jumbo" because of his large feet, Stiehm was a regimented, fiery man who was prone to frequent tirades on the sidelines. Despite this, his first Cornhuskers team, with nine returning starters from 1910, split the MVC championship with Iowa State.

Schedule

Coaching staff

Roster

Game summaries

Kearney State

Sources:

Stiehm's first game ended in a 117–0 blowout of Kearney State, two points shy of tying the program record of 119 points set in NU's previous game. This was the only meeting between Kearney State and Nebraska.

Kansas State

Sources:

Nebraska and Kansas State met for the first time in 1911, though they were not yet in the same conference.

at Minnesota

Sources:

Nebraska outgained Minnesota in both rushing and passing yards, but again fell to the Golden Gophers.

Missouri

Sources:

at Iowa State

Sources:

Doane

Sources:

With wins against both in-state opponents, Nebraska recorded their eighth unofficial state championship.

at Kansas

Sources:

Nebraska clinched a share of the Missouri Valley championship with a 6–0 win over Kansas.

Michigan

Sources:

Michigan stars Stanfield Wells and Miller Pontius were unable to play, prompting the Detroit Free Press to quip that Michigan could claim the "world championship of injuries".

In the third quarter of a scoreless game, Michigan end Frederick L. Conklin blocked a Nebraska punt and returned it 30 yards for a touchdown. The Chicago Daily Tribune wrote: "Conklin broke through, blocked it, turned like lightning and sped without interference across the goal line for Michigan's first touchdown." NU responded on its next drive with two long end runs that took the ball to Michigan's eight-yard line, and halfback Leonard Purdy finished off the drive with a touchdown.

The New York Times called the game "the hardest contest ever witnessed on Nebraska Field."

References

Nebraska
Nebraska Cornhuskers football seasons
Missouri Valley Conference football champion seasons
Nebraska Cornhuskers football